The Chico Midtown Station (more commonly known as the Downtown Chico Post Office) is a United States Postal Service office in downtown Chico, California.

The building is listed on the National Register of Historic Places. It was designed in Renaissance Revival style by J.W. Roberts and Oscar Wenderoth.

See also 

National Register of Historic Places listings in Butte County, California

List of United States post offices

References

External links 

Chicowiki entry on Chico Midtown Station

Post office buildings on the National Register of Historic Places in California
Buildings and structures in Chico, California
Renaissance Revival architecture in California
Government buildings completed in 1914
National Register of Historic Places in Butte County, California